Shaab Abu Nuhas, or Shab Abu Nuħas, is a triangular-shaped coral reef northwest of Shadwan Island in the northern Red Sea off Hurghada.

The reef is a navigation hazard because it projects into the shipping channel, as evidenced by (at least) seven shipwrecks. This includes the SS Carnatic (1896), Kimon M (1978), Olden (1987), Chrisoula K (1981) and Giannis D (1983). The name of the reef is Arabic for "reef of father of copper", after the cargo of one of the wrecks.

See also
 List of reefs

References 

Landforms of Egypt
Shipwrecks in the Red Sea
Underwater diving sites in Egypt
Coral reefs
Reefs of the Red Sea
Islands of Africa